Barbara Boyd (April 24, 1942 – November 5, 2022) was an American politician. She served twice as a Democratic member of the Ohio House of Representatives, serving the 9th district from 2007 to 2014, and the same district from 1993 until 2000.

Early life and education
Boyd was born in Cleveland and graduated from Saint Paul's College in Lawrenceville, Virginia.

Career
Boyd worked on President Jimmy Carter's campaign as a start to politics. She became the first African American elected to Cleveland Heights City Council in 1983, where she would ultimately serve as mayor.

Boyd also worked with the Ohio Department of Job and Family Services, as well as with the Children's Defense Fund.

Ohio House of Representatives
Boyd was originally elected to the Ohio House of Representatives in 1992, and would be reelected three times after before term limits forced her into retirement. In 2001, she was succeeded by Claudette Woodard.

In 2006, Boyd was again eligible to run for her former House seat after sitting out for four years. She did so, and won with 83.66% of the vote. She won a second term in 2008 with 87.55% of the vote. With Democrats retaking control of the House, Boyd would serve as Chairperson of the Health Committee for the 128th Ohio General Assembly. Boyd was reelected to a third term in 2010 with 86% of the vote. She also served on the committee of Veteran's Affairs.

Boyd faced primary opposition in 2012 for her eighth term, but  defeated challenger Howard Harris, securing 91.80% of the vote. She was unopposed in the general election. She was term-limited in 2014 and succeeded by her daughter, Janine Boyd.

Personal life and death
Boyd died on November 5, 2022, at the age of 80.

References

External links
 Campaign website

1942 births
2022 deaths
Democratic Party members of the Ohio House of Representatives
Politicians from Cleveland
Saint Paul's College (Virginia) alumni
Women state legislators in Ohio
Mayors of places in Ohio
People from Cleveland Heights, Ohio
African-American women in politics
Women city councillors in Ohio
African-American state legislators in Ohio
21st-century American politicians
21st-century American women politicians
20th-century American politicians
20th-century American women politicians
Women mayors of places in Ohio
African-American city council members in Ohio
20th-century African-American women
20th-century African-American politicians
21st-century African-American women
21st-century African-American politicians